Juliano Marlon Chade (born 14 March 1998), simply known as Juliano, is a Brazilian footballer who plays as a goalkeeper for Boa Esporte.

References

External links 
 
 

1998 births
Living people
Brazilian footballers
Association football goalkeepers
Club Athletico Paranaense players
Cianorte Futebol Clube players
Boa Esporte Clube players
USL League One players
Orlando City B players
Brazilian expatriate footballers
Brazilian expatriate sportspeople in the United States
Expatriate soccer players in the United States